Ma Long successfully defended his title by defeating Fan Zhendong 7–11, 11–6, 11–3, 11–8, 5–11, 7–11, 12–10 in the final.

Seeds
Matches were best of 7 games in qualification and in the 128-player sized main draw.

  Ma Long (champion)
  Fan Zhendong (final)
  Xu Xin (semifinals)
  Zhang Jike (third round)
  Dimitrij Ovtcharov (fourth round)
  Jun Mizutani (second round)
  Wong Chun Ting (quarterfinals)
  Timo Boll (quarterfinals)
  Chuang Chih-yuan (fourth round)
  Koki Niwa (quarterfinals)
  Jeoung Young-sik (first round)
  Vladimir Samsonov  (fourth round)
  Simon Gauzy (second round)
  Marcos Freitas (fourth round)
  Kenta Matsudaira (first round)
  Tiago Apolónia (first round)
  Lee Sang-su (semifinals)
  Stefan Fegerl (third round)
  Kristian Karlsson (first round)
  Kou Lei (second round)
  Hugo Calderano (third round)
  Bastian Steger (second round)
  Mattias Karlsson (third round)
  Yuto Muramatsu (third round)
  Chen Chien-an (second round)
  Ruwen Filus (fourth round)
  Alexander Shibaev (third round)
  Emmanuel Lebesson (second round)
  Panagiotis Gionis (third round)
  Quadri Aruna (second round)
  Andrej Gaćina (second round)
  Jang Woo-jin (third round)
  Lin Gaoyuan (fourth round)
  Jonathan Groth (third round)
  Gao Ning (second round)
  Pär Gerell (second round)
  Paul Drinkhall (second round)
  Patrick Franziska (second round)
  João Monteiro (second round)
  Ricardo Walther (second round)
  Liam Pitchford (first round)
  Robert Gardos (second round)
  Sharath Kamal (third round)
  Jeong Sang-eun (fourth round)
  Bojan Tokič (second round)
  Jakub Dyjas (second round)
  Jiang Tianyi (second round)
  Ho Kwan Kit (second round)
  Wang Zengyi (second round)
  Omar Assar (second round)
  Wang Yang (second round)
  Adrian Crișan (first round)
  Tomokazu Harimoto (quarterfinals)
  Tomáš Konečný (first round)
  Chen Weixing (second round)
  Ovidiu Ionescu (third round)
  Noshad Alamian (second round)
  João Geraldo (second round)
  Grigory Vlasov (first round)
  Tomislav Pucar (first round)
  Hunor Szőcs (third round)
  Soumyajit Ghosh (first round)
  Benedek Oláh (second round)
  Cho Seung-min (second round)

Draw

Finals

Top half

Section 1

Section 2

Section 3

Section 4

Bottom half

Section 5

Section 6

Section 7

Section 8

References

External links
Main draw

Men's singles